Teodoro "Teddy" Benigno, Jr. (18 May 1923 – 3 June 2005) was a leading Filipino journalist with a career spanning seven decades. His writings first graced the print media in 1946, when he joined the Manila Tribune as a sportswriter and police beat reporter. However, the greater part of his career was spent with the Agence France Presse, which he joined as a senior editor in 1950. He would spend 37 years with the AFP, serving as Manila bureau chief from 1962 until 1987. Benigno maintained extensive ties with France. Fluent in French, he studied at the Institut des Sciences Politiques and was awarded the French Legion of Honor in 1989.

Career
After President Ferdinand Marcos declared martial law in 1972, Benigno and other foreign journalists established the Foreign Correspondents Association of the Philippines, which proved a welcome balancing force to the Marcos-controlled media during martial rule. Benigno himself, unlike many other prominent anti-Marcos journalists such as Max Soliven and Don Chino Roces avoided imprisonment during Marcos's rule, shielded perhaps in part by his affiliation with a prominent international news organization as the AFP was.

In 1987, Benigno accepted President Corazon Aquino's offer to serve as her press secretary. He held the position until 1989, when he resigned to return to journalism. In June 1989, he began his famous column "Here's the Score", published by the Philippine Star. Benigno would also venture into broadcast journalism by hosting two public-affairs talk shows. The first, "Options" on the ABS-CBN channel, was short-lived. However, his succeeding show, "Firing Line" on the GMA channel, would prove durable and eventually attain international recognition. "Firing Line" deviated from the then popular round-table format adopted by most Philippine talk shows. It employed instead a format involving Benigno and his co-host grilling for an hour a solitary guest, normally a leading Filipino political figure of the day like Miriam Defensor-Santiago in 1992, but sometimes the occasional foreign dignitary such as Margaret Thatcher, Henry Kissinger, Willy Brandt, and Zbigniew Brzezinski. Benigno's co-hosts were also, as he was, former Aquino government officials - first, Executive Secretary Oscar Orbos, then eventually, economic planning secretary Solita Monsod. After the cancellation of "Firing Line", Benigno continued to write his column with the Philippine Star, which was regularly published for nearly sixteen years up until weeks before his death.

Benigno employed a highly literary style, replete with flowery descriptions and emphatic denunciations. His emotive style contrasted sharply with the dry stylings of Amado Doronilla, another contemporary of equal stature who writes for the Star's fiercest rival, the Philippine Daily Inquirer. Benigno's writing style became especially pointed in the last few years of his life, as he emerged as a bitter critic of Presidents Joseph Estrada and Gloria Macapagal Arroyo. He was frequently heard to lament the failings of the restored democratic rule, and became active in controversial reformist movements.

Personal life
He was married to Dominga "Meng" Comsti-Benigno (May 12, 1925 – December 13, 2010), with whom he had a daughter, Aurora Magdalena "Nena" C. Benigno. At a later time, he had a son named Marc Theodore by Luz Palacios.

Death
Benigno died on 3 June 2005, less than a month after being diagnosed with liver cancer. Former President Aquino, with whom he retained a close personal friendship, was one of his last bedside visitors.

Television
The World Today (GMA Network, 1972–1974)
Options (ABS-CBN, 1991–1995)
Firing Line (GMA Network, 1992–1999)

References

"Benigno succumbs to liver cancer; 81". (4 June 2005). Philippine Star, pp. 1, 4, 9.

External links
"Journalist Teodoro Benigno Jr. passes away" Inq7.net
 "Aquino confers awards on 6 key people who inspired 1986 EDSA revolt"
 "Awards During 25th Edsa Revolution Anniversary"
 Nena Benigno, LIFTING CHRIST UP THROUGH WRITING by Ruth Manimtim-Floresca
 "Voices in the Wilderness" by Nena C. Benigno

1923 births
2005 deaths
Agence France-Presse journalists
Presidential spokespersons (Philippines)
Deaths from cancer in the Philippines
Deaths from liver cancer
Filipino journalists
People from Manila
Corazon Aquino administration personnel
The Philippine Star people
GMA Integrated News and Public Affairs people
20th-century journalists
Secretaries of the Presidential Communications Operations Office